This is a list of characters associated with the Japanese manga and anime, Yakitate!! Japan.

Main characters

 
 A male 16-year-old bread artisan who dreams of making the perfect Japan. Initially, he doesn't seem very bright, but when it comes to bread he's a genius (He is knowledgeable about rice because of his grandfather, and Japanese food in general due to further learning and dealing with Japanese restaurants also it is found he is really good at math). Although only experienced in making Japan he had intuitively discovered established baking styles and methods in making various types of breads in his pursuit to make the perfect Japan; even if he is unfamiliar with their actual names. Azuma also has solar hands, exceptionally warm hands that allow the yeast to ferment faster and better when he is making his bread. Eternally optimistic and cheerful, he never gets upset from challenges faced in baking competitions, but rather from emotional tragedies. He gets his inspirations for his Japan from random sources, like other Japanese foods and stories from his experienced but over talkative grandfather, a rice farmer. Unexpectedly great at math when he solved a complicated math problem in his head in less than a minute that took Pierrot hours to conceive that was written out in the sand. He is also hinted to have a slight crush on Tsukino, and vice versa, but it is not stated explicitly in the series. At the last chapters, it is revealed that Kazuma has pure powerful heroic willpower infused from his powerful Solar Hand into one of his breads, such as sending Pierrot to the past via Time Donut to prevent his parents' deaths, then saving the world two times like freeing his former mentor, Yuichi from the Demon King of Bread's control, and from global warming. Finally, Kazuma is now awarded as the world's saviour.

 
 Granddaughter to the owner of the Pantasia chain, and understudy to Ken Matsushiro. Has difficulty getting along with the rest of the Pantasia-involved Azusagawa family because she is an illegitimate child. She is still very dedicated to the Pantasia chain, seeking out talented new bakers (like Azuma and Kawachi) and has garnered the support of many other characters. While she stays behind the scenes for most of the time as far as baking goes, she is implied to be very talented, as she managed to make it to the third place of a past newcomer's battle while extremely young (still wearing a schoolgirl backpack). After Yuuichi had bought out 60% of Pantasia stock and thus become owner, he made Tsukino become the president of Pantasia in order to keep her from forming her own bakery. She seems to have a crush on Azuma, though it was never stated clearly. She is also shown to be very naive, a good example is when Ken convinces Suwabara not to commit seppuku, telling him that Monica was pregnant with Kai's son, after losing to Azuma, Ken says 'when a man and a woman are living in the same house alone, there is nothing for them to do except-' She completes the sentence saying 'play cards, right, Manager?' Ken then chastises her for being so naive. In an omake near the end of the manga, it was shown that Tsukino and Azuma once encountered each other as children, though they did not recognise each other.

 
 Manager of Pantasia Southern Tokyo branch. A burly man with an afro and sunglasses.  Renowned as the best French-bread artisan in Japan, he seems to have a predilection with horses and betting on horse-racing. He is Kuroyanagi's former teacher, but early on recognised his outstanding talent as a food critic, and from that point on discouraged his baking, ultimately driving him away. He also likes to tease Kawachi, to whom he was apparently very similar in his youth, occasionally to give him ideas on bread, but mostly just for the hell of it. He also can make Kawachi hallucinate at times. Due to a series of mishaps, he had become the next heir of the Hashiguchi yakuza, much to his displeasure, but by the end of the manga he seems to have enthusiastically embraced his new role. During the Yakitate!! 25/Yakitate!! 9 Arc he claimed that Monica was pregnant with Kai's son to save him from committing seppuku after he lost to Azuma.

 
 Coworker and sidekick to Azuma, from the Kansai area. Initially, Kawachi's knowledge is superior to Azuma's, but as the story develops he becomes the fall guy and comedic relief with jokes focused on his incessant cry of "What was that?!" (lit. "Nanyate?!") and numerous outrageous reactions/illusions in every chapter. He considers Azuma to be his rival, but the two develop a dynamic that is more like an older and younger brother, Kawachi being more experienced than Azuma in the world beyond bread initially, but gradually changed to one with Azuma being knowledgeable while Kawachi can only act surprised. With Tsukino's help, he has obtained "solar gauntlets", solar hands developed through physical training. He is somewhat lazy and perverted, but at desperate times he focuses his effort to create exceptional bread. On one such occasion, he fulfilled the dream of his late father, a diligent but untalented baker, who wanted to make a white bread that was healthy, delicious, and could be eaten everyday. An interesting note about Kawachi is his hair style. Quite possibly the anime character with the most hair style changes throughout the entire series (a total of three for his real hair, as well as a huge assortment of wigs during his bald hairstyle, not to mention quite numerous separate hairstyle during reactions). In the manga, he also gone through a lot of shape changes, ranging from a russian doll to a mixture of food ingredient, down into even a very slimey mashed yam mixture. He is teased by everyone because of either his hairstyle or his intelligence. At times, even Azuma and Kanmuri tease him. He had a terrible inferiority complex to Azuma in the beginning of the series, but he gets over it, noticing that he is a good baker, and being content with the third place title he shares with Suwabara, while the latter is very disappointed at this. Though was seemingly uncredited at the last chapters, Kawachi is one of the two heroes along with Kazuma, who saved the world from the Demon King of Bread, and from global warming. Kawachi is currently remain in his Dhalsim-like form, a form he ate from one of Kazuma's bread and use its levitation powers all over the land to prevent the global warming, and currently ended up in Street Fighter world, beaten by Ryu and Ken.

 
 Kuroyanagi's understudy, a serious bread artisan. A master of the katana who claims to have left the swordsman path of destruction to follow the path of life-giving bread. Despite that, he often becomes very warrior-like and fearsome during baking competitions, which occasionally makes other characters wonder if he is truly focused on the 'life-giving' aspect of his bread. He was abandoned as a child when his father walked out on his family to perfect his own swordsmanship and never returned, and was forced to take up a job at a bakery to pay the bills, which resulted in his competitive attitude and cold personality. Like Kawachi, he has solar gauntlets and considers Azuma as a rival. On first appearances, he seems cold-hearted and tough, but in the Monaco Cup Final, he falls in love with a rival German baker working for the American team, Monica Adenauer, and shows a more tender side of himself. He has an unexplained fear of heights as shown in the parachuting into the Mexico arena. After he loses in the Newcomer's Battle, he was taught that techniques are not invented but "stolen" and improved. After this, he began studying and training once more, and created his own signature bread, Lupan.

 
 An extremely talented Pantasia baker, encountered first during the Pantasia Newcomers' Tournament and discovered to possess the solar hands as well. A Harvard graduate like Kuroyanagi, he looks up to him as a mentor, calling him 'Senpai' (which means Senior). He is considered as a "Harvard Junior Genius", having graduated the prestigious school at a very young age of sixteen. Originally working for Tsukino's evil sister Yukino Azusagawa, Kanmuri defected to the Pantasia's Southern Tokyo store to work with Azuma after Yukino blew up his research laboratory as a result of him losing to Azuma. He remained to keep the store throughout the Monaco Cup, but rejoined the team for the Yakitate!! 25/Yakitate!! 9 challenge. Recently revealed to be one out of the last two possible heirs to the Hashiguchi Company (the biggest gangster organization in Japan). Although he firmly states that he'd never join the Yakuza, problem sets as the other heir, Masanobu Tsutsumi, Shigeru's half-brother, shares the same sentiments. Tsutsumi is jealous at his half-brother for getting all the attention from their father, thus fueling his own determination to defeat the younger boy in a cooking/baking competition. This problem is promptly settled with a one-on-one battle in Yakitate!!25/Yakitate!! 9 (refer to Episode 62). He is probably named after a Shogakukan editor of the same name. He is usually the voice of reason during any match of Azuma's, explaining to everyone what exactly Azuma's strategy is. He is very feminine looking, with a beautiful face and shoulder-length, light pink hair. In a small omake in the manga, it was shown that when looked at close up, he looks exactly like Tsukino. In another omake, Tsukino commented on Kanmuri's long eyelashes.  Kanmuri replied that his eyelashes were long, but ingrown and painful.  Tsukino suggested that Kanmuri try out her eyelash curler and mascara, after which Kanmuri proclaimed, "This is great!"  Kinoshita, however thought, "I may vomit."Hashiguchi Takashi's editor is also named Shigeru Kanmuri.

Bread Judges

 
 The 22-year-old head at the main Pantasia branch, and a Harvard graduate with a Food Science diploma (There he had a girlfriend named Cathy but they got separated when he needs to go back to Japan). His passion and talent is food tasting, at which he excels. He has incredible physical senses, as he could deduce the cooking and fermentation times as well as the proportions of ingredients of a loaf of bread just by smelling it: he is even used as a sniffer to track down a runaway Suwabara during the match in Ōmagari. His strait-laced no-nonsense attitude belies his very silly quirk of making strange pun-based reactions to the delicious bread he's eating (during the match in Uppurui he married an extremely ugly woman just for the sake of a pun, getting a divorce five minutes later.)  He used to be the student of Ken Matsushiro, but Matsushiro drove Kuroyanagi away after realising his potential as a food critic. He is given the opportunity by Yuuichi Kirisaki to fully utilize his skills as a judge for the Yakitate!! 25 competition (Yakitate!! 9 in the anime). As shown in episode 60 he cares about bread more than  he cares about his or anyone else's life. Ken and Tsukino called him a bread zombie. He is also one of the many people who make fun of Kawachi.

 
A world class clown working as a bread judge, aged 22. Can speak 135 languages, divide into over a hundred copies of himself, and do all sorts of amazing things due to being a 'world-class' clown. Heir to the throne of Monaco, though he doesn't know it at first until the second Monaco Cup competition. Pierrot learns that he is heir to Monaco only through blood loss, he has an ultra-rare blood type called Bombay blood, which the king of Monaco also has. He became a world class clown so that his parents might find him, who he believed had abandoned him at the circus as an infant. In fact, he was given up to be brought up by ordinary foster parents away from the Royal palace, according to Monaco tradition. But these parents ran away with the money paid to them, leaving Pierrot behind. When they committed suicide, he was pronounced dead, but actually ended up in the Quedam circus.

 His biological mother had died at his birth. The King of Monaco (discovering he shared the same rare blood type with Pierrot) sacrificed himself to donate blood, after one of Pierrot's reactions (Kawachi's Final Victory) turns into 'murder' and he reveals his true background. He is later nicknamed 'Miracle Prince' and both teams decided to make a bread that let him see his parents once again. Azuma's Japan #61 allows him to change history, save his mother and father, and alter his entire life for the better, though he is shocked to discover that his parents are actually very stern disciplinarians. Pierrot is the predominant character of the Monaco Cup Arc, who gives the series a fresh aspect, away from just bread-making.

 An exceedingly fat bread judge. The character was a self reference by the author, Takashi Hashiguchi.  He used to be a successful manga artist, but he became too successful and gorged himself on only fine foods.  That resulted in his excess fat and now he only says, "Busy, busy." His only means of judging is by screaming, louder meaning that its better. Hachiguchi's first name is also a pun: while "Dēbu" is the Japanese pronunciation of the name "Dave," as it is written (デーブ) is translated as "Fat" or "Fatty."

Antagonists

 
 The eldest daughter of the Azusagawa sisters. Yukino is shown to be very cruel, such as by throwing Tsukino's mother's remains over a withered tree instead of placing them in a proper grave. She is conspiring with Yuuichi Kirisaki to take over Pantasia and had intended to buy up her grandfather's stock to become Pantasia's president, but ended up being the president of St. Pierre in a twist. She has a grudge against Pantasia and ended up trying to exhaust Pantasia's 12 billion yen won by Kanmuri when he bet on Team Japan during the Monaco Cup. She seems to have a sexual relationship with Yuuichi Kirisaki, who is later revealed to be a demon king of bread possessing Yuuichi's body. This character is another one of Azuma's antagonists and possesses the opposite of Solar hands: The Blizzard Hands. She also depsises Tsukino, since she is a mistress' child, even to the point of insulting her, which angers Azuma greatly. She is defeated by Azuma in the 10th match of Yakitate!! 25 and her reaction to his tart causes her to turn into pure air, which is later pumped into a humiliating blow-up doll that resembles her and is left abandoned in the forest where the final battle took place.

 
 The main antagonist, owner of St. Pierre, and ironically, the same 'kind old man' who encouraged Azuma and started his baking career in the very first chapter/episode. He is in league with Yukino, who, in her struggle to dominate her sisters for control of Pantasia, betrays the store and allows Kirisaki to buy it out. The reason for Pantasia's involvement in the Monaco Cup is so that Kanmuri can organize the ten billion yen required to protect the company, but in the end, the plot fails. Kirisaki allows the team a final chance in the Yakitate!! 25 (manga) /Yakitate!! 9 (anime) competition to win back Pantasia, but his ulterior motives for this are not yet clear. Yuuichi's brilliant and estranged son Meister Silvan Kirisaki is the general manager of Pantasia, and his daughter Sophie Balzac Kirisaki assists Azuma's team during the Monaco Cup out of a desire to murder her father.  Specialized in Gopan (Bread with rice or rice-based material in it), his baking ability is said to be strongest, as his bread can send even unsensitive people into a strong reactive state where they feel that they are one with the universe, and even Shadow can only copy him 98% on the first try. Ironically, Gopan is part of his dream to create a bread that can represent Japan, something Azuma's Japan is attempting to do.

 At the beginning, the nature of his evil is left ambiguous, since it is implied that he only acts evil in order to push Azuma to improve his skills, and was never revealed in the anime; in the anime, when he eats Kazuma's bread in the final round of Yakitate!! 9, he experiences a change of heart and explains to Pierrot why he has been so cruel to Kazuma, but when the effect of Kazuma's bread wears off, his original attitude returns and he continues to challenge Azuma. In the manga, it was revealed that his evilness was part of a reaction to his first ultimate Gopan, known as "Devil's Gopan" or "Maou", which is so addictive that, along with its violent withdrawal symptoms, it can transform a kind person into an evil person and vice versa while at the same time causing the eater to experience orgasmic levels of bliss; eventually, he was actually possessed by an entity known as Demon King of Bread, who had entered his Gopan due to the fact that the bread was made from Kirisaki's resentment towards other bakers and baking in general, and transformed into a hybrid of bread and human called "Hu-pan". After eating Azuma's ultimate Japan, he was reverted to his old self when the Demon King of Hu-pan physically ejected him from its (by now, completely bread-based with a head of Baphomet) body. Thought the Hu-pan Demon King itself was defeated by Kawachi's reaction to the ultimate Ja-Pan. However, before it was destroyed completely, the demon king made its last ditch by shooting a turtle bread to kill Kazuma, but Yuichi sacrificed himself saving Kazuma. Luckily, Yuichi can still be saved thanks to an early separation process where his body becomes part of Hokkaido, such as Daisetsuzan mountain. As Yuichi finally recovered, he entrust his son, Silvan, as a new heir to St. Pierre's main branch, as Yuichi planned to open a new branch in France, with his daughter, Sophie as his general manager.

 The true main antagonist of the series whom had been possessing Yuichi Kirisaki all the time. It was a result of Yuichi's resentment towards other bakers and baking in general, and unexpectedly infused his negative emotion into the bread completely during creation of ultimate Go-pan. As Yuichi eats a Go-pan infused negative emotions during a taste testing, His eyes are transformed into that of bread and possessed by the demon king itself, turning Yuichi into a Hu-pan, creating his own Hu-pan henchmen in human form with black dresses, as a mean to infect other human when they ate them, turning into one of them. The demon king's goal is to destroy the humanity and turned everyone into a Hu-pan through producing an evil Go-pan Yuichi unexpectedly created. During a final battle against Kazuma, the demon king transforms Yuichi's body into a complete Hu-pan. Unfortunately, Kazuma's ultimate Japan manage to strengthening Yuichi's mind of remembering Kazuma, splitting the demon king and Yuichi (which turns out acting as its head appearance for full Hu-pan form of demon king, sealed inside there) apart, as demon king revealed his true head similar to Baphomet, and its Hu-pan body is actually one of its true form. It was defeated by Kawachi's reaction to the ultimate Ja-Pan however, before it was destroyed completely, the demon king made its last ditch by shooting a turtle bread to kill Kazuma, but Yuichi sacrifice himself saving Kazuma, yet manage to survive from death thanks to an early separation process where his body becomes part of Hokkaido, such as Daisetsuzan mountain, leaving him injured. Though the world is saved, there are few remaining Hu-pan infected left like Kuroyanagi. Until that time, Kazuma and the rest of his gangs manage to find a cure found a cure to heal Yuichi from his injuries and rest of the Hu-pan infected people (except Yukino), the cure comes from Kazuma's heroic willpower that has been infused into his Japan, with the help of Kawachi's Balrog-like reaction to Azuma's Ultimate Ja-pan.

Rival bakers

 
 A contemporary of Ken Matsushiro and a master of sweet breads.  He had trained with Ken to receive "solar gauntlets," but after his promotions in St. Pierre, he became lazy and started slacking off.  He worked at the St. Pierre main branch in South Tokyo--a store opposite the one managed by Ken and Tsukino.  After drawing against Azuma in a nationally televised bread battle, Mokoyama was forced to leave St. Pierre and befriended Mizuno Azusagawa.  He joined the Pantasia Newcomer's Battle wearing a koala mask where he tied Azuma once again.  Later, in the Yakitate!! 9/25 arc, this time wearing a panda mask, he lost to Azuma.  Further, Azuma's bamboo flavored bread had the effect of transforming him into a real panda. Mokoyama was portrayed as a very effeminate man who was always worried about his complexion and appearance and at St. Pierre he had a harem of male bakers cater to his needs. His specialty is knitting, and he seems to be in love with the manager of Pantasia's southern Tokyo branch.  He calls him "Ken-chan" and in a picture Manager had drawn up, Mokoyama was shown peacefully knitting cloth that said "Ken (heart) Moko."

 
 Tsukino's little sister. Since Tsukino is a "love child", Mizuno has the support of her father. They have a bit of a rivalry over Azuma, whether for his baking skills or his heart. She is quite competitive, and not very honorable.  Once, Azuma told her that if he won against her in the newcomer's competition, then she had to call Tsukino onee-san, as a younger sister should.  In exchange, if he lost, he would have to work at her store.  Mizuno lost, but at first refused to call Tsukino onee-san.  She later consented to it, but also came up with another gamble: if Azuma lost against "Koala-chan," or Mokoyama, then Tsukino would have to give up her rights to owning Pantasia, complete with contract.  Azuma and Mokoyama tied, but Mokoyama gave up, making Azuma the winner. As of what happened to the ownership of Pantasia, Mizuno is still going for it. In Yakitate!! 25, she wasn't participating to help Mokoyama, but just wanted to watch her koala-chan battle against Azuma; she also apologized to Tsukino for their past sibling rivalry, while expressing her dislike of Yukino for selling out Pantasia. And in the end, she went back to join Pantasia with Panda Mokoyama and left Azuma.

 The anime presented her in a more sympathetic light in her first appearance. She does not attempt to gamble for Tsukino's ownership of Pantasia or necessarily back out of the original deal; instead, she merely shifts the original bet to Azuma's battle against the koala. Her kindness towards Mokoyama is also highlighted, the two of them being portrayed as much more like a father/daughter relationship than master/servant, and she is shown to be a very lonely little girl (as well as her brattier side).

Kayser Brothers

 

 

 
The three brothers are the owners of the largest bakery chain in France. Aside from Solar Hands (which all top bakers in france must have), they also have extreme nimble fingers of goddess hands (which Azuma and Suwabara also possess). Gran Kayser is also unique, in that his father also trained him such that his arms are abnormally large and strong, powerful enough to support the weight of him and his brothers. They are always hidden under a bird-like mask.

 Voiced by: Yutaka Aoyama, Megumi Matsumoto
A famous mime at least as good as Marcel Marceau, he is able to copy every actions of any human being perfectly; so perfect is that he unconsciously copy others, and thus forced to roll his eyes upward such that he do not see other people. Due to his perfect copy ability, Shadow can copy other baker's technique and recipe 100%, but even with Yuuichi Kirisaki as his basis, he is only able to copy 98% the first time. Due to this, he is one of the strongest bakers Azuma had faced, as he had basically become Kirisaki himself.

 
 Italian-American newcomer who worked at the Nagoya branch of Pantasia. His first episode appearance comes at 14. When he challenges Azuma at the Newcomers Battle. He's later seen at the Monaco Cup championships, challenging Kyousuke Kawachi.

 
 Masanobu is an Austrian court chef and Shigeru Kanmuri's half-brother whose speciality is jam. He competed against Kanmuri during the Yakitate! 25/Yakitate!! 9 program to decide who should take over their father's yakuza business. Despite his strong inferiority complex, he hates losing and is jealous of Kanmuri as he felt that Kanmuri's life was easier.

 
 A chef famous for his brand of seaweed, he entered Yakitate!! 9 with the intent of challenging Azuma after seeing him on TV during the Monaco Cup. Despite the techniques Azuma used during the competition, Norihei was able to defeat him, making him the only competitor who has done so. Despite his win, Norihei encouraged Azuma to strive to do better by giving him a recipe book on seaweed. Ironically, "Nori" means "seaweed".

CMAP
CMAP is an English acronym for "Cooking Meal Assemble People". It is also a spoof of the Japanese band, SMAP. CMAP is a group of four celebrity chefs and entertainers.

 
 Takumi is the most popular member of CMAP. He has red emo hair and somewhat sleepy looking eyes. Takumi is admired by lots of people, especially girls. He takes cooking as serious business. Because he has often played foreign roles, eventually, he has to speak both English and Japanese at the same time. He quit the group after Azuma defeated him. He resembles the character Akira Kamio from The Prince of Tennis. He also treats Azuma, Kanmuri and Kawachi very kindly after his match, having quit CMAP. He even gives them acupuncture to make up for the trouble.

 
 Hiroshi is the CMAP member with the glasses. He is mainly known to be the trio's main brains, in a sort of way. He also seems not to be too bright, as he had acknowledged Kawachi as the "commander" of Azuma's gang since he was standing out of the match.

 
 Shizuto is the long haired member of CMAP. He has a habit of saying "I kinda want you to die!" to his opponents, and his teammates.  He has a very feminine appearance, with long eyelashes.

 
 Go is the white haired member of CMAP. He possesses the Flame Arm (Honō no Ute), which surpasses the Solar Hands. (He also has a striking resemblance to the Bleach captain Tōshirō Hitsugaya)

Other characters

 
 With a mushroom-like head, Kageto Kinoshita works at Pantasia Southern Tokyo branch. Though all the characters talk about making new kinds of bread, he is usually the one who ends up doing all of the work at the store while everyone else is involved with bread-making competitions.  At first glance, he doesn't stack up to bread makers like Kawachi and Azuma, but Kageto seems to have the strange ability to work so fast it looks like there are several of him at once as well as actually making clones of himself. This is because he was raised in a family that works in a circus. He can also copy another's bread-making skills 95% as good as the original. Kinoshita also possesses the ability to sense if other people are talking about him elsewhere, and a frequent running gag in the show is the main characters not including him when talking about the bakery staff, which cuts to him realizing this. He often writes to his mother, who apparently lives elsewhere, telling her about whatever happens at Pantasia.

 
 He is the manager of the Pantasia Main Branch and a bread judge. Half-French, he is the son of Yuichi Kirisaki. The peacock feather in his mask is actually still attached to the bird itself, which is skillfully hidden by Meister's mastery of magic tricks. Additionally, when tasting bread, the feathers in Meister's mask can change, depending on how good the bread is. He seems to have some fan girls, who follow him whenever they can.

 Meister had a very tough childhood, his mother was simply a young woman owning a bread store at the time when she met Yuuichi, apparently, the two of them fell in love and had Meister; but when she got pregnant again with Sophie, he left to chase his dream to make a traditional style Japanese bread. After a while he came back with a few loaves of bread, just when Meister thought he came back for them Kirisaki greedily ate all the bread in front of his face, and the two never forgave him. However, Meister immediately forgives him after he discovered his father's situation of being possessed by his own experimental Gopan, Maou. Because of this, Meister had been keeping an eye on the Maou-possessed Yuichi's evil plan of dominating the world with bread, until the demon makes its final plan to transform humanity into Hu-pans by selling them Maou Gopan bread, much to Meister's fear. Following Maou's defeat after the real Yuichi is freed from its control by Kazuma and Kawachi, Meister succeeds his father as the new president of St. Pierre by the series' epilogue.

 
 He is a Chinese chef whose field of expertise is naturally Chinese cuisine and a close friend of Ken Matsushiro. He is the successor of an ancient Chinese assassination group called Ryuuke Shinken. This fact attributes to his cooking skill. Early on, he taught Azuma and Kawachi how to make yakisoba upon Matsushiro's request. During Yakitate!! 9, he competed against Azuma.

 
 Meister's younger sister. She remained in France as a baker. She is the female version of Meister, with the same blond hair and blue eyes.(See episode 38) Like the Kaysers, she possesses the La Main De Deesse.

 
 Pantasia's Owner and the grandfather of the three Azusagawa sisters (Yukino, Tsukino, Mizuno).

 
 Heidi is Dave's assistant. Since he can't move on his own, she's the one doing the work for him.

Coo-Coo
 
 Meister's pet peacock who usually acts as a spy for him. He accompanied Azuma and the others to France. During the newcomer's battle Coo came out after Meister tasted Azuma's bread. Also, when Ryo Kuroyanagi lost his sense of taste from an accident, Coo served as a back-up judge.

 
King of Monaco and father of Pierrot Bolneze. Died while due to giving too much blood to Pierrot after Pierrot was stabbed and in danger of blood loss. Was brought back to life along with his wife after Pierrot brings his mother and Leonhart's wife close to a hospital due to a "time travel" doughnut made by Azuma.

 
 Monica, after winning the 59th Pastries Competition, is the best pastry chef in the world despite being a relatively amateur baker. Her dream is to open a giant candy shop, as part her father's dream. Initially appeared as part of the American Team, she and Suwabara fell in love with each other, and challenged Pantasia together in Yakitate! 25/Yakitate!! 9. Upon losing to Azuma, Suwabara attempted to commit a harakiri. In order to save him, Matsushiro claimed that Monica was pregnant, Suwabara being the child's father. However, they have most likely never done it, since Suwabara said, "Is it possible to make a woman pregnant just by a hug like this?" Later in the series, Monica really does become pregnant, and has given birth to a son by the series' epilogue.

 
 One of Kawachi's opponents in the Newcomer's battle, he was able to design a very nice looking bread in the shape of his wife. However, after he lost, he began to wander the mountains, and met a pig, who taught him all about pigs. After granting the pig's final request—-eating it-—his face reacted, causing it to resemble a pig. Due to this knowledge, he is currently the "All-Japan meat Championship's Grand Champion", won by his special tonkatsu made with kaisersemmel bread crumbs.

 
 A supporting character who was Kuroyanagi's classmate in college and the president of a major detective agency in America. The character is a parody of the do-it-all American Brad Pitt. Kidd is used in many instances in the manga and anime as a sort of deus ex machina in reactions or flashbacks from a masseuse to an attorney or the head of a private investigation firm. However, in the anime, the character is only referred to as Kid, as evidenced by his building with the "KID" logo atop as well as a nametag he once wore, both in English characters.  In the Tagalog dub, he is called "Totoy."

References

Yakitate!! Japan